The Sauce Grande River is a river of Argentina.

See also
Salsa dance
Salsa music 
List of rivers of Argentina

References
 Rand McNally, The New International Atlas, 1993.
  GEOnet Names Server

Rivers of Argentina
Rivers of Buenos Aires Province